John Wood Farmstead is a historic home and farm located in Orange Township, Rush County, Indiana.  The farm was established in 1822, and the two-story, brick I-house built in 1831. Also on the property are the contributing early-19th century summer kitchen, two traverse frame barns (1863, c. 1900), late-19th early-20th century cattle barn, scales shed, milk house, silo, corn crib, and water trough.

It was listed on the National Register of Historic Places in 2000.

References

1822 establishments in Indiana
Farms on the National Register of Historic Places in Indiana
Houses completed in 1831
Buildings and structures in Rush County, Indiana
National Register of Historic Places in Rush County, Indiana